Ravinia Park is a seasonal station on Metra's Union Pacific North Line located in Highland Park, Illinois. The station serves the Ravinia Festival, and trains only stop at the Ravinia Park station during concert season. In Metra's zone-based fare system, Ravinia Park is located in zone E. (Metra honors dated concert e-tickets as a train fare to Ravinia on concert days.) Ravinia Park has two side platforms which serve two tracks. Ravinia Park is the only seasonal station in the Metra system.

As of 2022, during the summer, Ravinia Park is served by seven inbound trains and eight outbound trains on weekdays, by four inbound trains and eight outbound trains on Saturdays, and by four inbound trains and seven outbound trains on Sundays. (Extra train RAV1 is excluded from this tally.) Trains with a "" note on the timetable will wait longer at the station for passengers to load and unload.

The Ravinia Park station was temporarily closed in 2020 due to the cancellation of all concerts for the Ravinia Festival in 2020 in response to the ongoing COVID-19 pandemic. Service to Ravinia Park resumed in the summer of 2021.

References

External links
Metra - Ravinia Park

Metra stations in Illinois
Highland Park, Illinois
Railway stations in Lake County, Illinois
Union Pacific North Line